Hasibul Islam Mizan (7 September 1957 – 18 April 2019) was a Bangladeshi film director who directed many Dhallywood films.

Biography
Mizan was born in 1957 in Pirojpur. He made his debut as a director in Dhallywood with Premer Kosom. This film was the debut film of Mahfuz Ahmed. He directed Amar Shopno Tumi which was released in 2005. Tumi Achho Hridoye was his last direction which was released in 2007.

Mizan died on 18 April 2019 at the age of 62.

Selected filmography
 Premer Kosom
 Amar Shopno Tumi
 Jonmo
 Kopal
 Tumi Achho Hridoye

References

External links
 

People from Pirojpur District
Bangladeshi film directors
1957 births
2019 deaths